Robin Fisher (born 1946) is a Canadian historian known for his book on native relations in British Columbia, Contact and Conflict. Fisher is former provost and vice-president academic of Mount Royal University in Calgary.

Originally from New Zealand, Fisher completed a Bachelor of Arts degree at Massey University and a Master of Arts degree at the University of Auckland. He emigrated to Canada in 1970 to undertake a PhD at the University of British Columbia, where he became a scholar of the history of British Columbia and, in particular, of First Nation-European relations.

Fisher's academic career began in the department of history at Simon Fraser University where he was appointed assistant professor in 1974 and full professor in 1983.

In 1993, Fisher accepted the position of founding chair of the history program at the University of Northern British Columbia. He subsequently became dean, arts and science and, in 1997, dean of a newly formed College of Arts, Social and Health Sciences.

In 2002, Fisher joined the University of Regina as dean of arts. He joined Mount Royal University as provost and vice-president, academic in 2005 until 2010.

References

 Fisher, Robin (1977; 2nd ed., 1992) Contact and Conflict: Indian-European Relations in British Columbia, 1774-1890.  Vancouver: UBC Press.

1946 births
20th-century Canadian historians
Canadian male non-fiction writers
Living people
Massey University alumni
University of Auckland alumni
University of British Columbia alumni
Academic staff of Simon Fraser University
Academic staff of the University of Northern British Columbia
Academic staff of the University of Regina
Academic staff of Mount Royal University